There are ten stadiums in use by Arizona Complex League baseball teams, all located in Arizona. The oldest is Tempe Diablo Stadium (1968) in Tempe, home of the Angels. The newest stadium is Sloan Park (2014) in Mesa, the home field of the Cubs. One stadium was built in each of the 1960s and 1980s, three in each of the 1990s and 2000s, and two in the 2010s. The highest seating capacity is 15,000 at Sloan Park; the lowest capacity is 8,000 at American Family Fields of Phoenix, where the Brewers Blue and Gold squads play. All stadiums have a grass surface.

Stadiums
{|class="wikitable sortable plainrowheaders"
|-
! Name
! Team(s)
! Location
! Opened
! Capacity
! class="unsortable" | Ref(s)
|-
! scope="row" | American Family Fields of Phoenix
| ACL Brewers Blue/Gold
| Phoenix
| 1988
| align="right" | 8,000
|  
|-
! scope="row" | Camelback Ranch
| ACL DodgersACL White Sox
| Phoenix
| 2009
| align="right" | 12,000
|  
|-
! scope="row" | Fitch Park
| ACL Athletics
| Mesa
| 1997
| align="right" | 10,000
| 
|-
! scope="row" | Goodyear Ballpark
| ACL GuardiansACL Reds
| Goodyear
| 2009
| align="right" | 10,000
| 
|-
! scope="row" | Peoria Sports Complex
| ACL MarinersACL Padres
| Peoria
| 1994
| align="right" | 12,882
| 
|-
! scope="row" | Salt River Fields at Talking Stick
| ACL D-backs Black/RedACL Rockies
| Scottsdale
| 2011
| align="right" | 11,000
| 
|-
! scope="row" | Scottsdale Stadium
| ACL Giants Black/Orange
| Scottsdale
| 1992
| align="right" | 12,000
|  
|-
! scope="row" | Sloan Park
| ACL Cubs
| Mesa
| 2014
| align="right" | 15,000
|  
|-
! scope="row" | Surprise Stadium
| ACL RangersACL Royals
| Surprise
| 2003
| align="right" | 10,500
|  
|-
! scope="row" | Tempe Diablo Stadium
| ACL Angels
| Tempe
| 1968
| align="right" | 9,785
| 
|}

Map

Gallery

See also

List of Florida Complex League stadiums

References

External links

 
Arizona Complex League
Arizona Complex League stadiums